Cutting Edge was a British TV documentary series broadcast by Channel 4. It had been Channel 4's flagship documentary series between 1990 and 2017 that focused on political and social issues.

Episodes
There have been numerous episodes from 1990 to 2017 and some of the highlights include:

Shops and Robbers
Original airdate: 1994

Received some of Channel 4's highest ratings.

Graham Taylor: An Impossible Job

Original airdate: 24 January 1994

About England national football team's unsuccessful attempt to qualify for the 1994 World Cup. Manager Graham Taylor was harshly criticised by the tabloid press during these two years (1992–93), and the fly-on-the-wall documentary revealed a stressed team camp. It also gave birth to Taylor's catchphrase, "Do I not like that" (a statement rather than a question) and Phil Neal's touchline comment "Can we not knock it, boss ?"

Anti-Social Old Buggers
Original airdate: 22 June 2005

Run of episodes in 2005, about "Anti-Social Old Buggers" which included elderly recipients of Asbos, "The Black Widow", "Gridlock" and "The House Clearers".

The Black Widow
Original airdate: 29 June 2005

Documentary on Dena Thompson, a woman who murdered her second husband but who was also found to have had a 20-year career of fraud, deception and bigamy. She was acquitted of murdering her third husband. 4.5 million people watched the documentary, a 22% share of that evening's TV audience.

Blind Young Things

Original airdate: 30 April 2007

A 2007 documentary following students at the Royal National College for the Blind in Hereford. The film won a Royal Television Society award for Channel Four and the Cutting Edge team in 2008.

A Boy Called Alex
Original airdate: 24 January 2008

This documentary follows 16-year-old cystic fibrosis sufferer Alex Stobbs as he attempts to conduct Bach's Magnifcat at Eton College. This was followed by a second documentary in October 2009 called "Alex: A Passion for Life", which examines  Alex's life as a music student at King's College, Cambridge.

The Human Spider
Original airdate: 15 April 2008

Cutting Edge covered Alain Robert, one of the most daring climbers in the world, on some amazing free climbs around the globe.

Madeleine Was Here
Original airdate: 7 May 2009

Aired two years after the disappearance of missing child Madeleine McCann.

Captive for 18 Years: The Jaycee Lee Story
Original airdate: 1 October 2009

About the kidnapping of Jaycee Lee Dugard with interviews with people close to Jaycee when she was young, including family members, classmates and her headmistress.

Katie: My Beautiful Face
Original airdate: 29 October 2009

Followed the recovery of former model Katie Piper from a brutal acid attack, and which with 3.3 million viewers was the most-watched edition of the Cutting Edge strand in 2009; Piper's case has been subject to a large international response, and following the success of the original documentary Piper was invited to give Channel 4's Alternative Christmas Message for 2009.

The documentary was nominated for "Best Single Documentary" at the BAFTA Television Awards in June 2010, but did not win - the trophy was awarded to BBC One's Wounded. The previous month, director Jessie Versluys had won the Breakthrough Talent prize at the 2010 Craft BAFTA ceremony, for her credits including Katie: My Beautiful Face and The Hospital.

Octomom: Me and My 14 Kids
Original airdate: 12 November 2009

Follows single unemployed mother Nadya Suleman from California, who in January 2009 gave birth to eight children.

The Men Who Jump Off Buildings
Original airdate: 28 July 2010

About Dan Witchalls and Ian Richardson, who participate in the adrenaline sport, base jumping.

My Big Fat Gypsy Wedding

Original airdate: 18 February 2010

Follows four Gypsy and Traveller brides as they plan their wedding day. Screened in February 2010, drew 4.5 million viewers and was subsequently commissioned for a spinoff series called Big Fat Gypsy Weddings. This proved to be successful, with the second episode getting 7.4m viewers at its peak.

Production company(s): Firecracker Films

Raoul Moat: Inside the Mind of a Killer
Original airdate: 18 August 2010

Looks at the 2010 Northumbria Police manhunt and the following investigation.

My New Brain
Original airdate: 25 August 2010

Follows 20-year-old Simon Hales as he recovers from a traumatic brain injury.

Ian Brady: Endgames of a Psychopath
Original airdate: 20 August 2012

N/A

The Fried Chicken Shop: Life in a Day
Original airdate: 19 February 2013

N/A

Production company(s): Mentorn

References

External links
Cutting Edge at Channel4.com

1990 British television series debuts
2017 British television series endings
1990s British documentary television series
2000s British documentary television series
2010s British documentary television series
Channel 4 documentary series
English-language television shows